Fast Lane Addiction is Shannon Curfman's second full-length album.

Track listing 
 "Fast Lane Addiction" (Colett, Conklin, Krizan) - 2:59
 "Do Me" (Shannon Curfman, Young) - 3:39
 "Little Things" (Curfman, Grosse, Young) - 3:26
 "Square In A Circle" (Curfman, DeLeo, DeLeo, Young) - 4:19
 "Can't Let You Go" (Curfman, Jameson) - 3:30
 "Why" (Curfman, Krizan, Young) - 3:51
 "Tangled" (Curfman, Young) - 4:01
 "Another" (Curfman, Young) - 3:18
 "Stone Cold Bitch" - 3:48
 "Sex Type Thing" - 4:06
 "I Can't Wait To Miss You" (Angelo, Curfman) - 4:30

Charts
Album - Billboard (North America)

Personnel 
Shannon Curfman - vocals, guitar
Jimmy Bones - keyboards
Eric Hoegemeyer - drums
Aaron Julison - bass
Marlon Young - bass, guitar

Production 
Al Sutton - producer, engineer
Marlon Young - producer
Jason Miller - engineer, editing, mixing
Dan Curry - engineer
Eric Hoegemeyer - programming, producer, engineer, mixing
Greg Reierson - mastering

References 

2007 albums
Shannon Curfman albums